The Chinese Ambassador to Senegal is the official representative of the People's Republic of China to the Republic of Senegal.

List of representatives

See also
China–Senegal relations

References 

 
Senegal
China